Fage is a Greek dairy company and one of the major dairy brands in the country. 

Fage of FAGE may also refer to:

Places
 Fage, Albania, a village in Tirana municipality, Tirana County, Albania
 La Fage-Montivernoux, a commune in the Lozère department in southern France
 La Fage-Saint-Julien, a commune in the Lozère department in southern France
 Saint-Pierre-de-la-Fage, a commune in the Hérault department in southern France

Other uses
 Fédération de l'Administration Générale de l'État, a French trade union

People with the surname
 Antoinette Fage (1824–1883), French Catholic nun
 Ernie Fage (born 1953), Canadian politician
 Jean-Louis Fage (1883–1964), arachnologist
 John Fage (1921–2002), British historian of African history

See also
Fages (disambiguation)